Exalbidion is a genus of comb-footed spiders that was first described by J. Wunderlich in 1995.

Species
 it contains six species, found in the Caribbean and from Mexico to Brazil:
Exalbidion barroanum (Levi, 1959) – Panama, Ecuador
Exalbidion dotanum (Banks, 1914) – Mexico to Panama
Exalbidion fungosum (Keyserling, 1886) – Venezuela, Ecuador, Peru, Brazil, Argentina
Exalbidion pallisterorum (Levi, 1959) – Mexico
Exalbidion rufipunctum (Levi, 1959) – Mexico, Panama, Ecuador
Exalbidion sexmaculatum (Keyserling, 1884) (type) – Guatemala, Caribbean to Brazil

In synonymy:
E. tungurahua  = Exalbidion fungosum (Keyserling, 1886)

See also
 List of Theridiidae species

References

Araneomorphae genera
Spiders of Central America
Spiders of Mexico
Spiders of South America
Theridiidae